The Compagnie Marocaine de Navigation or Comanav (Moroccan Navigation Company) is a Moroccan shipping company and wholly owned subsidiary of the CMA CGM Group. Currently, it is the leader in the Moroccan market for maritime transport of passengers and freight, as well as port operations. In 2009, the company sold its ferries and passenger transport subdivision to Comarit which has since gone bankrupt.

History 
Compagnie Franco-Chérifienne de Navigation (CFCN) was founded in 1946. After the independence of Morocco in 1956, it changed its name to Comanav in 1959.

For the numerous Moroccan emigrants in Europe who returned to the country for the summer, the company decided in 1975 to offer a passenger ferry line between Tangiers and Sète. In the same year, it acquired five container ships to pursue its development along with its bulk carriers.

In 1993, a roll-on/roll-off (ro-ro) increased the companies capacity for the transport of lorries.

Five years later, Comanav became the first Moroccan shipowner to serve the Straits of Gibraltar, strengthening its position in the field of passenger transport in the Mediterranean region.

In 2007, the Moroccan state privatised the company, which was leased to a consortium represented by CMA-CGM for a sum of 2.2 billion Moroccan dirhams, equivalent to 200 million euros. The French company was interested above all in the port sector and yielded the passenger business to the Spanish company Balearia, which itself sold its share to a Moroccan operator, Comarit, for a sum of 80 million euros in February 2009.

Activities 
 Bulk transport
 Passenger transport
 Container transport
 Ro-Ro
 Port activities (Somaport, Tanger Med,...)

Some statistics 
Comanav's fleet consists of 14 vessels of which 10 are owned. Its capacity is for  teu,  passengers and  vehicles. Volumes transported annually are  teu,  units Ro-Ro,  tonnes of various goods and  passengers.

Regular links

Principal services (cargo)
 Atlantic :  Casablanca  Le Havre  Rouen  Dunkirk  Antwerp  Rotterdam
 Western Mediterranean :  Casablanca  Valencia  Barcelona  La Spezia 
 Ro-Ro lines : 
  Casablanca  Marseille
  Casablanca  Cadiz
  Casablanca  La Spezia  Genoa

Principal services (passengers)
  Tangier :
  : Algeciras 
  : Sète
  : Genoa
  Nador :
  : Almeria
  : Sète

Sources 
 Comanav official website
 CMA-CGM official website

Ferry companies of Morocco
Companies based in Casablanca
1946 establishments in Morocco
Transport companies established in 1946
Container shipping companies

nl:Comanav